Sabina, also earlier known as Monarch, is an unincorporated community in West Township, McLean County, Illinois, United States.

History

Sabina was established in 1878 on the Havana Rantoul & Eastern Railroad "Punkin’ Vine" narrow-gauge railway. Sabina was named for Mrs. Sabina Moore. She and her husband, Joseph G. Moore, were instrumental in the creation of the town. At one time Sabina had a hotel, church, two grain elevators, a general store and several homes. A post office was located in the hotel lobby. Unfortunately, there were several other similarly named towns and in 1881 the post office was named Monarch. In the late 19th century Sabina was often referred to by the name of its post office, Monarch.

Notes

Unincorporated communities in McLean County, Illinois
Unincorporated communities in Illinois